Creating The Last of the Strong Ones is feminist novel by Akachi Ezeigbo published in 1996. The first novel in her Umuga trilogy.

References 

1996 Nigerian novels
Feminist novels